Eastern Force was a component in 1916, of the British Empire's Egyptian Expeditionary Force which took part in the early Sinai campaign of the Sinai and Palestine Campaign in the First World War.

Commanded by the Canadian Lieutenant-General Charles Macpherson Dobell, it included a mobile arm called the Desert Column, the ANZAC Mounted Division, the Imperial Mounted Division and the 53rd (Welsh) Division under command. Other units assigned were the Imperial Camel Corps Brigade, the 52nd (Lowland) Division and the 54th (East Anglian) Division.

References

Commands of the British Army
Military units and formations of the British Army in World War I
Egypt in World War I